James Joseph McCoy (born 28 June 1958), also referred to as J.J. McCoy or Jimmy McCoy, is a former Ireland rugby union international. He was a member of the Ireland team that won the 1985 Five Nations Championship and the Triple Crown. He also represented Ireland at the 1987 Rugby World Cup. While playing for Ireland, McCoy was also a serving Royal Ulster Constabulary officer.

Playing career

Clubs and province
McCoy played rugby union at senior club level for Dungannon and Bangor. He also played for Ulster in the IRFU Interprovincial Championship, making his debut against Munster at Ravenhill in 1978 aged 19.
On 14 November 1984 McCoy was a member of an Ulster team that defeated a touring Australia 15–13 at Ravenhill.

Ireland
Between 1984 and 1989 McCoy made 16 full senior appearances for Ireland. He had previously represented Ireland at Under-23  and B levels. He made his senior debut on 4 February 1984 against Wales in an 18-9 defeat. He was a member of the Ireland team that won 1985 Five Nations Championship and the Triple Crown. He also represented Ireland at the 1987 Rugby World Cup. McCoy made his final appearance for Ireland on 18 November 1989 against New Zealand.

Notes

RUC officer
McCoy joined the Royal Ulster Constabulary on leaving school and was a serving officer during the Troubles. He initially served in Dungannon as a community officer. However he was subsequently transferred to Bangor. In a 2012 Irish Examiner interview with his former Ireland teammate, Donal Lenihan, McCoy says he was moved after the RUC received a warning of a threat to his life. McCoy denied receiving a bullet in the post from the IRA. When travelling to Dublin to play for Ireland, McCoy was escorted by Garda Síochána Special Branch officers.

Honours
Ireland
Five Nations Championship
Winners: 1985
Triple Crown
Winners: 1985
Ulster
IRFU Interprovincial Championship
Winners: ???

References

1958 births
Living people
Irish rugby union players
Ireland international rugby union players
Ireland Wolfhounds international rugby union players
Dungannon RFC players
Ulster Rugby players
Sportspeople from County Fermanagh
Royal Ulster Constabulary officers
Rugby union props